Peter C. Vey is an American cartoonist. Vey's cartoons have appeared in many publications such as The New Yorker, National Lampoon and MAD Magazine, his two major contributions to Mad include Duke Bissell's Tales of Undisputed Interest  and one panel gag cartoons under the title Vey To Go . Vey has collaborated with American Filmmaker, Bill Plympton as a writer and artist of several of his animated features

External links 
P.C. Vey's Website
Complete list of Vey's work for MAD Magazine

Living people
Year of birth missing (living people)
The New Yorker cartoonists